Luan da Conceição Silva (born May 28, 1993) is a Brazilian footballer who has played professionally in Brazil and the United States.

Career
Luan began playing football in Corinthians' youth system. He was loaned to Harrisburg City Islanders in 2014, and played in various Brazilian state leagues with Flamengo (SP), Cruzeiro (RS) and Boavista (RJ) before signing with Potiguar de Mossoró in early 2017.

References

External links

1993 births
Living people
Brazilian footballers
Penn FC players
Association football midfielders
Brazilian expatriate footballers
USL Championship players
Boavista Sport Club players
Associação Cultural e Desportiva Potiguar players
Footballers from Rio de Janeiro (city)